Crescentia cujete, commonly known as the calabash tree, is a species of flowering plant native to the Americas, that is grown in Africa, Central America, South America, the West Indies and extreme southern Florida. It is the national tree of St. Lucia. It is a dicotyledonous plant with simple leaves, which are alternate or in fascicles (clusters) on short shoots. It is naturalized in India. The tree shares its common name with that of the vine calabash, or bottle gourd (Lagenaria siceraria).

In Cuba, this tree is known to grow in both disturbed habitat and areas of poor drainage. It can grow up to 10 meters tall.

Uses

Caribbean
A calabash is primarily used to make utensils such as cups, bowls, and basins in rural areas. It can be used for carrying water, or for transporting fish, when fishing. In some Caribbean countries, it is worked, painted, and decorated and turned into items by artisans, and sold to tourists.

As a cup, bowl, or even a water-pipe or "bong", the calabash is considered consistent with the "Ital" or vital lifestyle of not using refined products such as table salt, or modern cooking methods, such as microwave ovens. In Haiti, the plant is called kalbas kouran, literally, "running calabash", and is used to make the sacred rattle emblematic of the Vodou priesthood, called an asson. As such, the plant is highly respected. It is the national tree of St. Lucia. In Cuba, the dried fruit is commonly used as a coffee cup by rural farmers. In Dominican Republic, the plant is called the higüero tree and it is popularly used to make decorative objects and ornaments, though historically it has been used in all sorts of ways.

Costa Rica
The Costa Rican town of Santa Bárbara de Santa Cruz holds a traditional annual dance of the calabashes (baile de los guacales). Since 2000, the activity has been considered of cultural interest to the community, and all participants receive a hand-painted calabash vessel to thank them for their economic contribution (which they paid in the form of an entrance ticket).

Native Americans throughout the country traditionally serve chicha in calabash vessels to the participants of special events such as the baile de los diablitos (dance of the little fiends - literally, dance of the little devils).

Mexico
In many rural parts of Mexico, the calabash is dried and carved hollow to create a bule or a guaje, a gourd used to carry water around like a canteen. The jícara fruit is cut in half, which gave the parallel name to a clay cup also called jícara. These jícaras can also be used for serving or drinking.

Brazil
Bowls made of calabash were used by Brazilians as utensils made to serve food, and the practice is still retained in some remote areas of Brazil (originally by populations of various ethnicities, origins and regions, but nowadays mainly by Native Americans). The fruit are also commonly used in Brazil as the resonator for the berimbau, the signature instrument of capoeira, a martial art/dance developed in Brazilian plantations by enslaved Africans.

Colombia
In Colombia, the dried fruit is halved and then partially filled with either stones, beads, seeds, broken glass or a combination and is then used to keep the rhythm in bullerengue music. The dried fruit are filled with certain seeds and a handle is made to make maracas in multiple Latin American countries (especially Colombia and Cuba).

Africa
In Western and Southern Africa it is also used for decoration and musical instruments. Calabash bowls are also widely used by women working as artisanal gold miners, to 'pan for' & recover fine grains of gold.

References

External links
 
 Plant of the Week 31 January 2005: Calabash Tree (Crescentia cujete)
 Philippine Medicinal Plants: Cujete
 

cujete
Trees of Central America
Trees of the Caribbean
Tropical fruit
Trees of the Dominican Republic
Trees of Cuba
Trees of Panama
Trees of Mexico
Trees of Belize
Trees of Brazil
Trees of Colombia
Trees of Africa
Flora of northern South America
Fruits originating in North America
Medicinal plants of Central America
Medicinal plants of South America
National symbols of Saint Lucia
Plants described in 1753
Taxa named by Carl Linnaeus
Flora without expected TNC conservation status